Mohammad Hisham Sanad (born 16 January 1991) is an Egyptian handball player for USAM Nîmes Gard and the Egyptian national team.

He was a member of the Egypt men's national handball team at the 2016 Summer Olympics, and at the World Men's Handball Championship in 2017, 2019 and 2021.

Honours
Club
Zamalek
 African Handball Champions League: 2011; runner-up 2012
 African Handball Cup Winners' Cup: 2011
 African Handball Super Cup: 2011, 2012

Heliopolis
 Egyptian Handball Cup: 2014

USAM Nîmes Gard
 Coupe de France: runner-up 2017–18

International
Egypt
 African Championship: 2016, 2020; runner-up 2018
 African Games: 2015

References

External links

1991 births
Living people
Egyptian male handball players
Olympic handball players of Egypt
Handball players at the 2016 Summer Olympics
Expatriate handball players
Egyptian expatriate sportspeople in Hungary
Egyptian expatriate sportspeople in Spain
Liga ASOBAL players
Sportspeople from Cairo
Handball players at the 2020 Summer Olympics
Competitors at the 2022 Mediterranean Games
Mediterranean Games silver medalists for Egypt
Mediterranean Games medalists in handball